Harmony is a 2010 album by Chinese singer-songwriter Sa Dingding, produced by Marius de Vries and released on Wrasse Records.

Track listing
 天地记 (Ha Ha Li Li)
 绿衣女孩 (Girl In a Green Dress)
 自由行走的花 (Hua)
 石榴女人(Pomegranate Woman)
 蓝色骏马 (Blue Horse)
 云云南南 (Yun Yun Nan Nan)
 快乐节 (Xi Carnival)
 小树和大树 (Little Tree/Big Tree)
 希然宁泊·自省.心经 (Xi Ran Ning Po – Introspection )
 幸运日 (Lucky Day)
 天地记 (Ha Ha Li Li) – Paul Oakenfold Remix

An expanded version of the album has two further remixes of the first track.

External links
Harmony at Wrasse Records
, Universal Music video
Track by track explained by Sa Dingding

2010 albums
Sa Dingding albums
Albums produced by Marius de Vries
Wrasse Records albums